Australian singer Kate Ceberano has released 17 studio albums, three compilation albums, five live albums, two soundtrack album, and 42 singles.

Albums

Studio albums

Live albums

Soundtrack albums

Compilation albums

Singles

As lead artist

Other singles

Other appearances

See also
 Bear Witness
 Models (band)

References

Discographies of Australian artists
Pop music discographies